George Walker (14 May 1894 – 11 May 1973) was an Australian rules footballer who played with Melbourne in the Victorian Football League (VFL).

Notes

External links 

1894 births
1973 deaths
Australian rules footballers from Victoria (Australia)
Melbourne Football Club players